"Znayu Ya" ("I know") is a song of Ukrainian singer Ruslana released in 2001.

Music video 
Znayu Ya(I Know) is a work about Ukrainian Carpathians, the first video clip filmed and arranged for demonstration in modern movie theaters. Personnel of 250 workers. Seven studios in five countries, 4 kilometers of video tape footage, sound by Dolby Digital 5.0 (licensed by Dolby Laboratories, London). Color by DigitalFilmFinland, Helsinki. Record-breaking high budget, many trick effects and much technical equipment. Unique video shooting of Carpathian mountains from helicopter, numerous scenes in Mountains, video fragments of a true Hutsul wedding in ethnic costumes, incredible national color of Hutsul culture.

Ruslana songs
2001 songs
Songs written by Ruslana